De La Salle College was an independent Roman Catholic comprehensive single-sex secondary day school for boys, located in Ashfield, an inner-western suburb of Sydney, New South Wales, Australia.

Established in 1916 by the De La Salle Brothers and Vincentian Fathers, the college caters to students in Year 7 to Year 12 from the inner-west Parishes of the Archdiocese of Sydney. The college is under the patronage of the Archbishop of Sydney, Anthony Fisher. De La Salle College is one of 18 Lasallian Schools in Australia, and in the 1970s became the first Catholic high school in Australia to have a lay headmaster.

On 8 June 2022, it was announced that the college would amalgamate with adjacent girls' high school, Bethlehem College, and St Vincent’s Primary School, due to increasing demand for co-educational schools in inner Sydney. From 2023, the new school was known as St Vincent's College and from 2027, after a five year transition period, it will become a fully K-12 co-educational school precinct.

The school is affiliated with the Catholic Secondary Schools Association NSW/ACT, and the Metropolitan Catholic Colleges Sports Association (MCC).

In education, the college was fully accredited in 2018 to run the Newman Selective Gifted Education Program (the Gifted and Talented program), which caters towards the significant learning needs of capable students. The program is currently being facilitated in a number of the Catholic Primary and Secondary Schools within Sydney Catholic Schools. The school also uses Inquiry-Based Learning approach, focusing mainly on the Solution Fluency framework. They offer a number of co-curricular activities and experiences, including immersions to Lasallian schools overseas. The school follows the NSW Syllabus and Australian Curriculum.

History
The foundation stone for the school was laid on 10 December 1916. Upon completion a year later, the school consisted of just three classrooms, and was located behind a boarding house that was to become a monastery for the six De La Salle brothers who were given the task of educating Catholic boys of the Ashfield parish.

Despite the effects of the Great Depression, enrolments continued to increase, with 300 on the role in 1931. Through the efforts of Father Macken, a provincial of the Vincentian Fathers, the college established a separate primary school in 1934. Further, a "tech" was established in 1937 for boys who would not be going on to university or office jobs. The two-stream system of "pros" and "techs" continued until 1955.

Lay staff were employed in 1956 as the number of brothers had declined. The 1960s saw further change with the Wyndham scheme introduced in 1962 necessitating the addition of new subjects to the curriculum, and thus requiring more specialist rooms. With support from the parish and the Old Boys' Union, the principal of the time, Br Peter, began to expand the college. The main building of the college opened in 1966 during the celebration of its Golden Jubilee.

In 1972, Peter Donnan became the first lay principal of the school, thus making the school the first Catholic high school in Australia administered by a lay principal. The college's primary section closed in 1988.

In 2008, five new science laboratories were completed and an air-conditioned multi-purpose hall with seating for up to 1500 and a full theatrical lighting and sound system was added. The college hall hosted the World Youth Day 2008 Journey of the Cross and Icon (JCI) in Sydney.

In 2013, the college began implementing its student laptop program where all students could have their own personal device, now called Bring Your Own Designated Device (BYODD).

Principals
The following individuals have served as College Principal or any precedent title since the College's opening in 1917. The current principal is Paul Forrester.

Co-curriculum

Sport
De La Salle College is a member of the Metropolitan Catholic Colleges Sports Association (MCC), and competes in a range of sports including athletics, cricket, cross country, basketball, golf, rugby league, soccer, squash, swimming, tennis, touch football and volleyball.

Through MCC, the college competes against schools such as Christian Brothers' High School, Lewisham, LaSalle Catholic College, Bankstown, Marcellin College Randwick, Marist College Kogarah, Champagnat Catholic College Pagewood, Holy Cross College Ryde and Marist Catholic College North Shore. Sport has traditionally been an important part of college life, notwithstanding the school's own limited sporting facilities.

The college also has a number of elite sporting pathways for students who excel at particular sports and wish to play or compete at a professional level.

Other co-curricular activities
Since 2015, the college has offered students in Years 9-12 the ability to complete the Duke of Edinburgh (or Duke of Ed). The program is offered through the school and students from Lasallian brother & sister schools around the world frequently join participants in their hikes.

The college also excels in debating and public speaking, through the Catholic Schools Debating Association (CSDA) and other public speaking competitions.

In music, the college offers in-school instrumental & vocal tuition and also participates in the Australian A Capella Awards (AUSACA). The school also has a college choir and band. In creative arts, the college offers chances to enter national and international art competitions.

Other co-curricular activities at the college include current affairs & social justice club, science club, photography club, the Tournament of Minds competition and coding club.

The college also offers opportunities to take part in different competitions in the performing and creative arts.

Notable alumni
 Mike Bailey – TV weatherman and radio presenter for the Australian Broadcasting Corporation (also attended De La Salle Bankstown)
 Paul Bevan – AFL player for Sydney Swans
 Colin Brooks – politician, Member of the Victorian Legislative Assembly for Bundoora
 Nathaniel Buzolic – Australian actor, known for his role as Kol Mikaelson on the CW show The Vampire Diaries and its spin-off The Originals.
 Tony Costa — Australian Archibald Prize winning artist
 Pat Drummond – singer song-writer
 Robbie Farah – rugby league player for South Sydney Rabbitohs and a representative for New South Wales rugby league team
 Warren Fellows – Convicted drug runner and associate of Neddy Smith
 Michael Maher – former politician, variously Member for Drummoyne and Member for Lowe
 Paul Pantano – Australian actor
 Gerard Price — cricket player and Cricket NSW cricket manager
 Michael Rowland — TV news presenter
 John Sidoti – politician, Member for Drummoyne (2011 – present)
 Salvatore Coco — Actor
 Paul Whelan – former NSW  politician
 Justice Philip Woodward – former Judge of the Supreme Court of New South Wales

See also

 List of Catholic schools in New South Wales
Lasallian educational institutions
 Catholic education in Australia

References

External links
De La Salle College Ashfield website
De La Salle College Ashfield newsletter
Lasallian Schools (Australia)

Educational institutions established in 1916
Catholic secondary schools in Sydney
Boys' schools in New South Wales
Metropolitan Catholic Colleges Sports Association
1916 establishments in Australia
Ashfield
Inner West